Victoria Dubourg or Victoria Fantin-Latour (1 December 1840 – 30 September 1926) was a French still life painter.

Dubourg was born in Paris and trained with artist Fanny Chéron. There, she met the painter Henri Fantin-Latour, whom she married in 1876. She collaborated with him on his floral paintings, but also produced works under her own name that she signed "V Dubourg". Dubourg has been critiqued as an artist whose work lacks originality, simply reproducing the styles of her well known husband.   However, a careful review of her early work shows that Dubourg began producing still life two years prior to meeting Fantin-Latour.

Her painting A Basket of Flowers was included in the 1905 book Women Painters of the World.

Biography
Dubourg was born in 1840, and her parents recognized her when they married in 1843. She had one sister, Charlotte Dubourg (1850–1921). Dubourg's maternal family was originally from Orne. Her mother Françoise Bienvenu was born in Sées, where her parents lived. Her father Philippe Bienvenu then lived in Buré and bequeathed her the house located at a place called La Croix on his death on March 28, 1878. Fantin-Latour represents the Dubourg family bereaved after the disappearance of the old man.

The family lived for a few years in Frankfurt where Victor Dubourg trained in medicine after teaching Letters.

Back in Paris, Dubourg was trained by Fanny Chéron (born 1830), a woman painter originally from Mortagne who opened a workshop for young girls. A music lover and pianist, Dubourg also studied painting and copied the major works of artists such as Willem Kalf at the Louvre. There, she met Henri Fantin-Latour, who painted his first portrait of her in 1873. They later married in 1876.

Victoria Dubourg’s early works displayed a style close to Fantin-Latour, such as a portrait of her sister, Charlotte, from 1870. However, after exhibiting portraits in the late 1860s, she diverged from styles similar to Fantin-Latour and created only still-lives of fruit and flowers. After her husband’s death Victoria continued to paint with a supple, freer brushstroke. Her colors were more vibrant, as seen in her 1908 painting, Chrysanthemums.

During their marriage, Fantin-Latour and Dubourg lived at rue de l'Université n°19 in Paris, in the building where Marie and Félix Bracquemond had lived. Dubourg both collaborated on her husband's floral paintings and produced personal work that she signed "V Dubourg". She is part of the circle of Édouard Manet, Berthe Morisot and Edgar Degas.

Following the death of Fantin-Latour in 1904, she organized a major retrospective of his work and devoted several years to the development of a catalogue raisonné, to the detriment of her own work.

Victoria Dubourg exhibited at the Salon in Paris from 1869, then at the Salon of French artists and at the Royal Academy in London, of which she was a member like her husband. In Paris, she obtained an honorable mention in 1894 and a medal in 1895. She was named Chevalier of the Legion of Honor in 1920.

In 1921, she bequeathed the photographic body of her husband to the Museum of Grenoble, given that he was a native of the city.

References

 
Victoria Dubourg Fantin-Latour (1840-1926) by Galerie Ary Jan
 Victoria Fantin-Latour (née Dubourg) by Oxford Art Online
Bridget Alsdorf, “Painting the Femme Peintre,” in Laurence Madeleine, ed., Women Artists in Paris, 1850-1900 (New York: American Federation of Arts/New Haven: Yale University Press, 2017) 22-39.
Elizabeth Kane. “Victoria Dubourg: The Other Fantin-Latour.” Woman’s art journal 9, no. 2 (1988): 15–21.
Fantin-Latour: Une Famille de peintres au XIXe siècle (exh. cat., Grenoble, Mus. Peint. & Sculp., 1977).
E. Hardouin-Fugier and E. Grafe: French Flower Painters of the Nineteenth Century: A Dictionary (London, 1989), p. 179.

1840 births
1926 deaths
Painters from Paris
19th-century French painters
French women painters
Flower artists
19th-century French women artists
20th-century French painters
20th-century French women artists
Still life painters